is a spin-off series of Crayon Shin-chan. On July 14, 2016, Amazon Japan announced they would exclusively stream the spin-off, with all seasons consisting of 13 episodes of about seven minutes each.

The regular series follows the adventures of the five-year-old Shinnosuke "Shin" Nohara and his parents, baby sister, dog, neighbours, and friends and is set in Kasukabe, Saitama Prefecture. The first season of the spin-off series is set 100 years from the present time, starting with the entire Nohara family and their pet dog waking up in an unfamiliar space station.

In May 2022, all four seasons were dubbed into English.

Manga

Episodes

Season 1 (Shin chan Spin-off vol.1 Aliens vs. Shinnosuke)
The first season entitled Crayon Shin-chan Spin-off: Alien vs. Shinnosuke (クレヨンしんちゃん 外伝エイリアンvs.しんのすけ Kureyon Shin-chan Gaiden Eirian vs. Shinnosuke) started streaming exclusively on Amazon Prime Video Japan on August 3, 2016. The first season became available on December 14, 2016 on Amazon Prime Video in various European countries, India, Canada and Australia and on January 12, 2017 worldwide with Japanese audio and English, German, Spanish, French, Italian and Portuguese subtitles as Shin chan Spin-off vol.1 Aliens vs. Shinnosuke.

Season 2 (Crayon Shin-chan Spin-off: Toy Wars)
The second season entitled Crayon Shin-chan Spin-off: Toy Wars (クレヨンしんちゃん外伝 おもちゃウォーズ) started streaming on the site on November 9, 2016.

Season 3 (Crayon Shin-chan Spin-off: Lone Wolf and Family)
The third season entitled Crayon Shin-chan Spin-off: Lone Wolf and Family (クレヨンしんちゃん外伝 家族連れ狼 Crayon Shin-chan Gaiden Kazokuzure Ōkami) started streaming on the site on February 22, 2017.

Season 4 (Crayon Shin-chan Spin-off: O-O-O-No Shinnosuke)
The fourth season entitled Crayon Shin-chan Spin-off: O-O-O-No Shinnosuke (クレヨンしんちゃん外伝 お・お・お・のしんのすけ) started streaming on the site on May 31, 2017.

References

Amazon Prime Video original programming
Japanese children's animated comedy television series
Japanese adult animated comedy television series
Animated television series by Amazon Studios
Crayon Shin-chan
Comedy anime and manga
Shin-Ei Animation